(28 December 1941 – December 2002) was a Japanese tenor saxophone player, known for playing in a distinctive and powerful free jazz style. He played with many of the most important Japanese free groups and musicians during the seventies, such as ESSG and those of Masahiko Togashi, Motoharu Yoshizawa and Masayuki Takayanagi.

History
Takagi was born in Osaka in 1941, but grew up in Yokohama. During his younger years, he spent time in the bands of players like Charlie Ishiguro and Hisashi Sakurai, but only really began developing his distinctive free style when he joined the Motoharu Yoshizawa Trio in 1968. The following year he joined Togashi's Quartet and ESSG. After Togashi's accident, Takagi played briefly with Masayuki Takayangi's New Direction Unit and in a duo with percussionist Sabu Toyozumi. From November 1973 he spent one year playing in France, returning to Japan in November 1974. Takagi recorded very few albums as a leader over the course of his career, but he was highly valued as a collaborator by many Japanese jazz, rock and avant-garde musicians.

Discography

As leader/co-leader
 We Now Create, w/ Masahiko Togashi Quartet (Victor, 1969)
 Isolation, w/ Masahiko Togashi (Columbia, 1971; recorded 1969)
 Speed & Space, w/ Masahiko Togashi Quartet (Union, 1969)
 Come back to Foster, w/ 1864 Cotton Field Rock Band (Victor, 1970)
 If Ocean Is Broken w/ Sabu Toyozumi (Qbico, 2006) – recorded in 1970
 Amalgamation (Kokotsu no Showa Genroku), w/ Masahiko Sato & Soundbreakers (Liberty, 1971)
 Jazz a Maison du Japon Paris, w/ Takashi Kako (Nadja, 1974)
 Origination, w/ Toshiyuki Tsuchitori (ALM, 1975)
 Mothra Freight! (Interval, 1975)
 Waterweed, w/ Sabu Toyozumi (1975)
 Story of Wind Behind Left, w/ Masahiko Togashi Quartet (Columbia, 1975)
 Meditation Among Us, w/ Milford Graves et al. (Kitty, 1976)
 Concrete Voices, w/ EEU (1977)
 Talking about Fussa, w/ King Kong Paradise (Tam, 1977)
 Duo & Trio, w/ Derek Bailey et al. (Kitty, 1978)
 Grow, w/ Koji Kikuchi (Johnny's Way, 1986)
 Kozan, w/ Hirokazu Yamada & Motoharu Yoshizawa (Tiara, 1986)
 Call in Question, w/ Masayuki Takayanagi New Direction (PSF, 1993) - recorded in 1970
 Deep Sea/Abyss Duo 1969 (Shinkai), w/ Motoharu Yoshizawa (PSF, 1994) - recorded in 1969
 2001.07.06 (Chitei, 2001)
 Domo Arigato Derek Sensei, w/ Henry Kaiser et al. (Balance Point Acoustics, 2006)
 If Ocean Is Broken w/ Sabu Toyozumi  (Qbico, 2009)
  w/ Takashi Kako, Sabu Toyozumi (Kaitai, 2012)
  w/ Takashi Kako, Sabu Toyozumi (Kaitai, 2012)
 Live at FarOut, Atsugi 1987 (NoBusiness, 2020) w/ Derek Bailey – live recorded in 1987

Other appearances
 V.A., 2 to 10 Saxophone Adventure (Phillips, 1970)
 V.A., Sensational Jazz '70 (Columbia, 1970)
 V.A., Genya (Soseki, 1971)
 V.A., Inspiration & Power 14 (1973)

References

Soejima Teruto. Nihon furii jazu shi (日本フリージャズ史, The History of Japanese Free Jazz). Tokyo: Seidosha, 2002 (Japanese)

External links
WFMU tribute show to Takagi

Musicians from Osaka
1941 births
Japanese jazz saxophonists
Living people
21st-century saxophonists
NoBusiness Records artists